Peter David Talbot Applegarth  (born 6 August 1958) is a justice of the Supreme Court of Queensland in the Trial Division. He is a graduate of the law schools at both University of Queensland and Oxford University, and has served on the bench since 2008.

References

Judges of the Supreme Court of Queensland
Living people
1958 births
University of Queensland alumni
Alumni of Magdalen College, Oxford
Members of the Order of Australia
Australian Senior Counsel
People educated at Brisbane State High School